Il sorpasso (occasionally titled The Easy Life) is a 1962 Italian cult comedy film co-written and directed by Dino Risi and starring Vittorio Gassman, Jean-Louis Trintignant and Catherine Spaak. It is considered Risi's masterpiece and one of the best examples of the commedia all'italiana film genre.

Plot
The film starts in a sun-baked and seemingly empty Rome on an August morning during the Ferragosto national holiday. A young, timid law student, Roberto (Trintignant), gazing out his window, is asked by a 36-ish man named Bruno (Gassman), who is passing on the street below at the wheel of a convertible Lancia Aurelia, to make a phone call for him. Roberto tells him to come up and make the call himself. After Bruno fails to contact his friends — he is running a full hour late for his meeting with them, something he apparently doesn't deem a good enough motive for them to have "abandoned" him — he insists on repaying Roberto's courtesy with an aperitivo. Tired of studying for the day and falling prey to Bruno's enthusiasm, Roberto accepts.

Thus begins a cruise along the Via Aurelia, the Roman road that also gives the name to Bruno's beloved car. Roberto is unwilling or unable to part from this casual acquaintance despite having almost nothing in common with him. Bruno is loud, brash, risk taking, a bit coarse, and a braggart to boot. He drives recklessly, speeding and constantly attempting "il sorpasso" — the impatient and aggressive practice of serial tailgating and honking to overtake other cars on the road. He is also charming and likable, however, and Roberto feels drawn to Bruno's impulsive, devil-may-care attitude.

Over two days of highs and lows across the coasts of Lazio and Tuscany, the two men fall into various adventures while gradually learning more about each other. They spontaneously drop in on Roberto's relatives, and, as a result of some of Bruno's observations, Roberto realizes his childhood was not as golden as he had remembered it. Later, he finds out about Bruno's failed marriage and teenage daughter, which reveals a life not nearly as carefree as the one Bruno pretends to lead.

Firmly rejected by his wife, whom he had not divorced years ago as expected, Bruno wakes Roberto and suggests they sleep on the beach. The next morning, on a now-crowded beach, Bruno hits on some young women, and is surprised to find one is his daughter in disguise. Taking this as a suggestion to reconnect with his lost daughter, they swim and boat together, leaving Roberto to ingratiate drinks and food on his own. Later, Bruno wins some money at ping-pong, he and Roberto drink some, then decide to return to Rome before dark.

The bonding and emerging friendship between the two men is cut short when, spurred on by an enlivened Roberto, Bruno attempts to overtake another car on the blind curve of a cliffside road. He swerves to avoid an oncoming truck and is thrown from the car. Roberto goes over the cliff in the car, leaving a bloodied and shocked Bruno by the side of the road. When a police officer arrives and asks Bruno about the man who went over the edge, Bruno realizes he does not even know Roberto's last name.

Cast

 Vittorio Gassman - Bruno Cortona
 Jean-Louis Trintignant - Roberto Mariani
 Catherine Spaak - Lilli Cortona 
 Claudio Gora - Bibi
 Luigi Zerbinati - commendatore
 Franca Polesello - commendatore's wife
 Luciana Angiolillo - Bruno's wife
 Linda Sini - Aunt Lidia
 Nando Angelini - Amedeo

Reception and legacy
The movie is considered one of the best examples of commedia all'italiana.

Film critics frequently acknowledge that the story offers a poignant portrait of Italy in the early 1960s, when the "economic miracle" (dubbed the "boom" — using the actual English word — by the local media) was starting to transform the country from a traditionally agricultural and family-centered society into a shallower, individualistic and consumerist one.

It was one of two highest-grossing Italian films in Italy for the year ended 30 June 1963 along with Sodom and Gomorrah.

The Roman customizer crew Emporio Elaborazioni Meccaniche dedicated a customized bike to the movie. They named a MotoGuzzi V11 cafe racer "Sorpasso".

Soundtrack
The soundtrack includes original themes by Riz Ortolani, and Italian 1960s hits such as "Saint Tropez Twist" by Peppino di Capri, "Quando, quando, quando" performed by Emilio Pericoli, "Guarda come dondolo" and "Pinne fucile ed occhiali" by Edoardo Vianello and "Vecchio frac" by Domenico Modugno.

Awards
 Italian National Syndicate of Film Journalists Nastro d'Argento
 Winner: Best Actor (Migliore Attore Protagonista)- Vittorio Gassman
 Mar de Plata Film Festival
 Winner:  Best Director- Dino Risi

References

External links 
 
 
 
 Il sorpasso: Italy, Dark and Light an essay by Antonio Monda at the Criterion Collection

1962 films
1960s Italian-language films
Commedia all'italiana
Italian comedy road movies
Italian black-and-white films
Films set in Rome
Films set in Tuscany
Films shot in Rome
Films directed by Dino Risi
Films scored by Riz Ortolani
Films with screenplays by Ruggero Maccari
Italian buddy comedy films
1960s buddy comedy films
1960s comedy road movies
1960s Italian films